The Hockey East Player of the Year is an annual award given out at the conclusion of the Hockey East regular season to the best player in the conference as voted by the coaches of each Hockey East team.

The Player of the Year was first awarded in 1985 and every year thereafter.

Three players (Greg Brown, Chris Drury, and Johnny Gaudreau) have received the award two separate times, all doing so in consecutive years. The award has been shared three times, in 1999–00, 2002–03 and in 2015–16. (as of 2022)

Award winners

Winners by school

Winners by position

See also
Hockey East Awards

References

General

Specific

External links
Hockey East Awards (Incomplete)

College ice hockey trophies and awards in the United States